Mark I. Gardner (born September 21, 1955, in Boston, Massachusetts) is one of the most prolific patent holders in the world. Forbes magazine and USA Today have cited Gardner's achievements. His past and current inventions are focused upon consumer electronics, energy, computers, semiconductors, integrated circuits, physics and educational devices.

Education
From 1973 to 1977, Gardner attended the University of Lowell, Lowell, MA (now the University of Massachusetts, Lowell campus), and graduated Cum-Laude with a BS in Physics. Gardner obtained his master's degree in Physics from the University of Maryland, College Park, Maryland in 1980.

Career
Gardner has held positions at Advanced Micro Devices, Texas Instruments and Micron in the fields of microelectronics, semiconductors, transistors, High-K Gate Dielectrics High-k dielectric, memory cells, integrated circuits, device fabrication, process development, and device engineering.

Inventions
During his career as an engineer, inventor, physicist, Gardner created the 515 issued United States Patents. In the year 2000, Gardner was awarded over 160 issued patents in one year, which is a record for the most inventions for a United States citizen for a one-year period. He is a part-time professor of physics at Austin Community College. A partial list of his inventions can be found at the United States Patent and Trademark office.

Gardner has most recently patented an idea focusing on technology currently being utilized by several mobile conglomerates that many think may be infringing.  The patent includes claims relating to a mobile device communicating with a secondary device to access credit card information, purchased tickets, financial institutions, driver licenses, and passports (to name a few).

References

American inventors
Living people
University of Massachusetts Lowell alumni
University of Maryland, College Park alumni
1955 births